Malik Zulqarnain Dogar is a Pakistani politician who had been a Member of the Provincial Assembly of the Punjab, between 1997 and May 2018.

Early life and education
He was born on 6 January 1960 in Sheikhupura Pakistan.

He has the degree of Bachelor of Laws LL. B. which he received in 1990 from Punjab Law College.

Political career
He was elected to the Provincial Assembly of the Punjab as a candidate of Pakistan Muslim League (N) (PML-N) from Constituency PP-143 (Sheikhupura-X) in 1997 Pakistani general election. He received 12,648 votes and defeated Rai Asghar Ali Khan, an independent candidate.

He was re-elected to the Provincial Assembly of the Punjab as a candidate of Pakistan Muslim League (Q) (PML-Q) from Constituency PP-172 (Sheikhupura-XI) in 2002 Pakistani general election. He received 33,497 votes and defeated Chaudhry Tahir Meraj Gujjar, a candidate of PML-N.

He ran for the seat of the Provincial Assembly of the Punjab as a candidate of PML-Q from Constituency PP-172 (Nankana Sahib-III) in 2008 Pakistani general election, but was unsuccessful. He received 17,881 votes and lost the seat to Shah Jehan Ahmad Bhatti, a candidate of Pakistan Peoples Party (PPP).

He was re-elected to the Provincial Assembly of the Punjab as a candidate of PML-N from Constituency PP-172 (Nankana Sahib-III) in 2013 Pakistani general election. He received 29,032 votes and defeated an independent candidate, Shahzad Khalid Khan.

References

Living people
Punjab MPAs 2013–2018
Punjab MPAs 2002–2007
1960 births
Pakistan Muslim League (N) politicians
Punjab MPAs 1997–1999